Ivica Cvitkušić (born 8 September 1961) is a  Croatian retired footballer, who played in Croatian, Slovenian and Swedish clubs.

Club career
Cvitkušić was born in Gradačac, Bosnia and Herzegovina, where he played in his youth. After a brief stint in NK Dinamo Zagreb, he spent several seasons in NK Dinamo Vinkovci, where he would later marry and make a permanent home. Later on, he played for Bosnian FK Rudar Ljubija and Swedish Djurgårdens IF and Vasalunds IF.

He played 15 Allsvenskan matches and made one goal for Djurgårdens IF in the 1992 Allsvenskan. He scored in the Tvillingderbyt match against AIK on 11 May 1992. Upon return from Sweden, he continued his career in Slovenia, and became the national champion with ND Gorica in 1995. He returned to Croatia and played as a captain for HNK Vukovar '91, where he ended his playing career.

Post-playing career
After retirement from playing, he continued career as a coach. He took over NK Zvijezda Gradačac from his birth town, and during the next eight years as a coach and sports director he helped promote it from the third to the First League of the Federation of Bosnia and Herzegovina. Afterwards, he worked in several lower-ranking clubs in Slavonia, including "Frankopan" from Rokovci and "Šokadija" from Babina Greda.

Personal life
Cvitkušić lives in Vinkovci with his wife and three children.

References

1961 births
Living people
People from Gradačac
Sportspeople from Vinkovci
Association football defenders
Yugoslav footballers
Croatian footballers
GNK Dinamo Zagreb players
HNK Cibalia players
FK Rudar Prijedor players
Djurgårdens IF Fotboll players
Vasalunds IF players
ND Gorica players
HNK Vukovar '91 players
Yugoslav First League players
Allsvenskan players
Superettan players
Slovenian PrvaLiga players
Croatian expatriate footballers
Expatriate footballers in Sweden
Croatian expatriate sportspeople in Sweden
Expatriate footballers in Slovenia
Croatian expatriate sportspeople in Slovenia